Noor Faleh Almaleki (February 18, 1989 – November 2, 2009) was an Iraqi American who died as a result of a collision from an automobile, inflicted as part of an honor killing perpetrated by her father, in Peoria, Arizona (Phoenix metropolitan area), an act of filicide.

Amnesty International USA stated that the murder was in headlines across the United States "because it happened in Arizona" instead of a faraway foreign country.

Background
The family left Iraq when Almaleki was four, and moved to the Phoenix area in the mid-1990s. Noor's father, Faleh Hassan Almaleki, originated from Basra, Iraq. Almaleki and her family lived in Glendale, Arizona and later in the Paradise Views subdivision of Phoenix. She attended Dysart High School in El Mirage. Faleh had received his U.S. citizenship and Noor had graduated from high school. Before her death she attended Glendale Community College.

Almaleki's parents clashed with her over her lifestyle and dress. Her father had her go to Iraq to marry an older cousin, but she flew back to Arizona in 2008 and began dating someone of her own choosing. Abigail Pesta, the editor-at-large of Marie Claire, wrote "It's unclear whether a wedding actually took place." In the spring of 2009 she moved into her own apartment but lost income when her family members turned up at her places of employment, forcing her to go back to her family's house. In June 2009 she moved into the household of other Iraqi Americans, former friends of the family. She developed a romance with the son of the family, which upset her relatives. Pesta stated that "Noor filed for a restraining order, but seems never to have finalized the paperwork." Paul Rubin, in the Riverfront Times, wrote "From their perspective, a man's daughters are his property, and they are supposed to live with him until he decides otherwise."

Crime and arrest
On October 20, 2009, Almaleki was assisting her boyfriend's mother with translation at an office of the Arizona Department of Economic Security, in Peoria. Outside the office, Faleh struck them with his vehicle. As a result, Almaleki suffered bleeding in her brain and other injuries, though the skull never fractured. Parts of her body were paralyzed. The collision also injured her boyfriend's mother, including fracturing her pelvis. Faleh did not stop and render aid, nor did he call for help.

Doctors performed surgery on Almaleki's spine while police officers were assigned to guard her. The authorities did not reveal to her family where she was, fearing that her mother or siblings may try to kill her. Almaleki was put in a coma.

Pesta wrote "police records indicate that her family tried to help her father flee abroad." Faleh drove to Mexico, left his car in the city of Nogales, and boarded a flight to London from Mexico City. The UK Border Agency did not allow Faleh to enter the UK, and he was arrested after British authorities returned him to the United States.

A urinary tract infection spread to Almaleki's heart. Maricopa County medical examiner Dr. Kevin Horn stated that the infection, and not the direct injuries from the collision, caused Almaleki's death. On November 2, she experienced brain death and her life support was disconnected.

Criminal penalty and aftermath 
The trial began on January 24, 2011. Faleh's lawyers stated in his trial that while he indeed hit the two women with his car, he did not intend to kill them, and therefore was guilty of second degree murder. Prosecutors attempted to get a first degree murder conviction, but did not seek capital punishment against Faleh. Faleh was convicted of second degree murder on February 22, 2011. The jury did not find that the act was premeditated.

In April 2011, Faleh was sentenced, at age 50, on multiple counts: for murdering his daughter he was sentenced to 16 years, for injuring her boyfriend's mother he received 15 years, and for leaving the scene of a crime without permission he received three and one half years. Because they are to be served consecutively, Faleh received a total of 34 and one half years in prison as his penalty.

A friend established a Facebook group in her honor; by 2010 its membership was about 4,000.

48 Hours aired an episode about the crime.

See also

 Honor killing in the United States
 Ali Irsan (killed Gelareh Bagherzadeh and Coty Beavers)
 Murder of Tina Isa
 Sandeela Kanwal
 Yaser Abdel Said (killed Amina and Sarah Said)
 Pela Atroshi (ethnic Kurdish Iraqi woman killed in an honor killing in Iraqi Kurdistan)
 Banaz Mahmod (ethnic Kurdish Iraqi woman killed in an honor killing in the United Kingdom)
 Forced marriage

References

Further reading
 
 Media

External links
 

1989 births
2009 deaths
2009 murders in the United States
American Muslims
American people of Iraqi descent
Filicides in the United States
History of women in Arizona
Honor killing in the United States
Honor killing victims
October 2009 crimes in the United States
Pedestrian road incident deaths
People from Glendale, Arizona
People from Peoria, Arizona
People from Phoenix, Arizona
People murdered in Arizona